Epilobium parviflorum, commonly known as the hoary willowherb or smallflower hairy willowherb, is a herbaceous perennial plant of the family Onagraceae.

Etymology
The genus name derives from the Greek words "epi" meaning "upon" and "lobos" meaning "lobe", with reference to position of the petals above the ovary. The specific Latin name of "parviflorum" means "small flowers".

Description

The biological form of Epilobium parviflorum is hemicryptophyte scapose, as its overwintering buds are situated just below the soil surface and the floral axis is more or less erect with a few leaves.

Epilobium parviflorum reaches on average  in height. The stem is erect and densely covered with hairs, especially in the lower part. The tiny flowers are pale pink or pale purple,  in diameter, with four petals, eight stamens and a 4-lobed stigma. Flowering occurs from June to August in the Northern Hemisphere. The hermaphroditic flowers are either self-fertilized (autogamy) or pollinated by insects (entomogamy). Fruit is a three-to seven-centimeter long capsule containing very small black seeds (about 1 mm long), with white fibres that allow the dispersal by wind. This species is quite similar to Epilobium hirsutum, but the flowers are much smaller.

Distribution
This plant occurs in most of Europe, including Britain, from Sweden  to Northern Africa and Western Asia up to Kashmir, in United States and Canada.

Habitat

Medicinal uses
Extracts of this plant have been used by traditional medicine in disorders of the prostate gland, bladder and kidney, having an antioxidant and antiinflammatory effect . Epilobium parviflorum herb has been prescribed internally as tea in the traditional Austrian medicine for treatment of disorders of the prostate, kidneys, and urinary tract. Extracts of Epilobium have been shown to inhibit proliferation of human prostate cells in-vitro by affecting progression of the cell cycle.

References

  West Highland Flora
 Epilobium parviflorum
 Tutin, T.G. et al. - Flora Europaea, second edition - 1993

External links

 Photo Flora
 Biolib

parviflorum
Plants described in 1771
Taxa named by Johann Christian Daniel von Schreber
Flora of Malta